Filthy Empire is the only studio album by British rock band Heaven's Basement. The album, which was released on 4 February 2013 after initially being scheduled for a January release, was produced by the American musician and producer John Feldmann. Filthy Empire was released on record label Red Bull Records, with whom the band signed in late 2011.

Track listing

Sources:Filthy Empire CD liner notes.

Personnel
Heaven's Basement
 Aaron Buchanan — lead vocals
 Sid Glover — guitars, backing vocals
 Rob Ellershaw — bass guitar
 Chris Rivers — drums

Additional musicians
 John Feldmann — piano on "Fire, Fire" and "The Price We Pay"
 Cameron Stone — cello on "The Price We Pay"

Production
 John Feldmann — production, mixing
 Brandon Paddock — mixing, first engineer
 Pete Beukelman — second engineer

Other
 James Minchin III — photography

Sources:

Use in video games

References

2013 debut albums
Heaven's Basement albums
Albums produced by John Feldmann
Red Bull Records albums